Below is the list of Kazakhstan related articles.

General

Geography

Mountains

Lakes

Rivers

Islands

Other land features

History

Politics, government, and law

Politicians

Administrative divisions

Demographics

Science and technology

Religion

Economy

Culture

Sports

Others 

Kazakhstan
 
Kazakhstan